New Bedford is an unincorporated community in Coshocton County, Ohio, United States.

History
New Bedford originally consisted of several cabins and a single tavern. It was laid out in 1825. The community derives its name from Bedford County, Pennsylvania, the native home of a first settler. A post office called New Bedford was established in 1828, and remained in operation until 1955.

References

Populated places in Coshocton County, Ohio
1825 establishments in Ohio
Populated places established in 1825